The canton of South Châtellerault is a former French canton of the Vienne département in the Poitou-Charentes région of France. It was disbanded following the French canton reorganisation which came into effect in March 2015. It consisted of three communes: the primary town of Châtellerault (partly), Naintré, and Senillé. Its population was 15,161 in 2012.

References

Former cantons of Vienne
2015 disestablishments in France
States and territories disestablished in 2015